Ren Kainan (August 1884-July 1949) was a Chinese educator who served as president of Hunan University from June 1927 to July 1929.

Biography
Ren was born in Xiangyin County, Hunan, during the Qing Empire. He attended Hunan Industrial High School (now Hunan University). After graduation, he went to studied at Waseda University, in Shinjuku of Tokyo, Japan. When he studied at Japan, he got acquainted with Huang Xing, and joined the Tongmenghui. He returned to China in 1911, after the Xinhai Revolution, he established the Republic of China Daily in French concession in Hankou, Hubei. The Beiyang government closed down the newspaper when its articles againsted Yuan Shikai's restoration of monarchy. He received his Doctor of Economics from the University of London in 1921.

He returned to China in 1922 and that year became President of Hunan Business School. He also founded Changsha Dalu School and served as Chief-Librarian of Hunan Provincial Library. In 1926, he became a professor at Hunan University, he became its president in June 1927, and held that office until July 1929. In August 1927, he was recruited by National Wuhan University (now Wuhan University) as a professor, and became its director of Department of Economics in October 1932. In July 1937, he served as provost of Hunan University and concurrently served as board chairman of Changsha Dalu School. In 1940, he served as president of Changsha Dalu School. After the Second Sino-Japanese War, he resigned. 

In July 1949, he died of stroke in Changsha, Hunan.

References

External links

1884 births
People from Xiangyin County
1949 deaths
Waseda University alumni 
Alumni of the University of London
Presidents of Hunan University
Academic staff of Hunan University
Academic staff of Wuhan University